Trimethylenemethane (often abbreviated TMM) is a chemical compound with formula .  It is a neutral free molecule with two unsatisfied valence bonds, and is therefore a highly reactive free radical.  Formally, it can be viewed as an isobutylene molecule  with two hydrogen atoms removed from the terminal methyl groups.

Structure 
The electronic structure of trimethylenemethane was discussed in 1948. It is a neutral four-carbon molecule containing four pi molecular orbitals. Thus, it can be described either as zwitterion, or as the simplest conjugated hydrocarbon that cannot be given a Kekulé structure. It can be described as the superposition of three states:

It has a triplet ground state (3A2′/3B2), and is therefore a diradical in the stricter sense of the term.  Calculations predict a planar molecule with three-fold rotational symmetry, with approximate bond lengths 1.40 Å (C–C) and 1.08 Å (C–H).  The H–C–H angle in each methylene is about 121°.

Of the three singlet excited states, the first one, 11A1 (1.17 eV above ground), is a closed shell diradical with flat geometry and fully degenerate threefold (D3h) symmetry.  The second one, 11B2 (also at 1.17 eV), is an open-shell radical with a D3h-symmetric equilibrium between three equal geometries; each has a longer C–C bond (1.48 Å) and two shorter ones (1.38 Å), and is flat and bilaterally symmetric except that the longer methylene is twisted 79° out of the plane (C2 symmetry).  The third singlet state, 21A1/1A1′ (3.88 eV), is also a D3h-symmetric equilibrium of three geometries; each is planar with one shorter C–C bond and two longer ones (C2ν symmetry).

The next higher energy states are degenerate triplets, 13A1 and 23B2 (4.61 eV), with one excited electron; and a quintet state, 5B2 (7.17 eV), with the p orbitals occupied by single electrons and D3h symmetry.

Preparation 

It was also obtained from photolysis of 3-methylenecyclobutanone, both in cold solution and in the form of a single crystal, with expulsion of carbon monoxide.  In both cases, trimethylenemethane was detected by electron spin resonance spectroscopy.

Trimethylenemethane has been obtained also by treating potassium with 2-iodomethyl-3-iodopropene and isobutylene diiodide2C= in the gas phase.  However the product quickly dimerizes to yield 1,4-dimethylenecyclohexane, and also 2-methylpropene by abstracting two hydrogen atoms from other molecules (hydrocarbon or potassium hydride).

Organometallic chemistry

A number of organometallic complexes have been prepared, starting with Fe()(CO)3, which was obtained by the ring-opening of methylenecyclopropane with diiron nonacarbonyl ((CO)9). The same complex was prepared by the salt metathesis reaction of disodium tetracarbonylferrate ((CO)4) with 1,1-bis(chloromethyl)ethylene (H2C=C(CH2Cl)2).  Related reactions give M(TMM)(CO)4 (M = Cr, Mo). The reaction leading to (TMM)Mo(CO)4 also gives Mo()(CO)3 containing a dimerized TMM ligand.

TMM complexes have been examine for their potential in organic synthesis, specifically in the trimethylenemethane cycloaddition reaction with only modest success. One example is a palladium-catalyzed [3+2]cycloaddition of trimethylenemethane.

References

Free radicals